Thomas Fisher (27 May 1891 – 20 March 1968) was a New Zealand rugby union player. A loose forward, Fisher represented Buller and Marlborough at a provincial level. He was a member of the New Zealand national side, the All Blacks, on their 1914 tour of Australia, playing five games and scoring one try, but he did not appear in any test matches.

Fisher died in Wellington on 20 March 1968, and was buried at Karori Cemetery.

References

1891 births
1968 deaths
New Zealand rugby union players
New Zealand international rugby union players
Buller rugby union players
Marlborough rugby union players
Rugby union flankers
Burials at Karori Cemetery